The Catch was a baseball play made by New York Giants center fielder Willie Mays on September 29, 1954, during Game 1 of the 1954 World Series at the Polo Grounds in Upper Manhattan, New York City. During the eighth inning with the score tied 2–2, Cleveland Indians batter Vic Wertz hit a deep fly ball to center field that had the runners on base poised to score. However, Mays made an over-the-shoulder catch while on the run to record the out, and his throw back to the infield prevented the runners from advancing. The Giants won the game 5–2 in extra innings, and eventually the World Series. The Catch is regarded as one of the greatest plays in baseball history.

The play
In the top of the 8th inning with the score tied 2–2, Giants starting pitcher Sal Maglie walked Indians lead off hitter Larry Doby. Al Rosen singled, putting runners on first and second. New York manager Leo Durocher summoned left-handed relief pitcher Don Liddle to pitch to Cleveland's Wertz, a left-handed batter.

In many stadiums the ball would have been a home run, which would have given the Indians a 5–2 lead. However, the Polo Grounds center field was larger than average, and Mays, who was playing in shallow center field, made an on-the-run, over-the-shoulder catch at the warning track for the out. Having caught the ball, he immediately spun and threw to second base. Doby, the runner on second, might have been able to score the go-ahead run had he tagged at the moment the ball was caught; as it was, he ran when the ball was hit, then had to scramble back to tag. Mays' throw went to second base, holding Cleveland to runners at first and third with one out. 

Right-hander Marv Grissom then relieved Liddle, who supposedly remarked to coach Freddie Fitzsimmons, "Well, I got my man." Grissom walked pinch hitter Dale Mitchell to load the bases, then struck out pinch hitter Dave Pope, and got catcher Jim Hegan to fly out, ending the inning with no runs scored.

Broadcast
Jack Brickhouse, calling the game for NBC television along with Russ Hodges, described Mays' catch to viewers. The audio has been published on CD with the 2000 book And the Fans Roared, and also as accompaniment to the World Series film.

Brickhouse: There's a long drive... way back at center field... way back, back, it is a... Oh my! Caught by Mays! The runner on second, Doby, is able to go to third. Willie Mays just brought this crowd to its feet with a catch which must have been an optical illusion to a lot of people! Boy! [pause] Notice where that 483 foot mark is in center field? The ball itself—Russ, you know this ballpark better than anyone else I know—had to go about 460, didn't it?

Hodges: It certainly did, and I don't see how Willie did it, but he's been doing it all year.

Brickhouse: Willie Mays just made the catch of the day.

There is some question of the depth of straight-away center field. Sometimes there was a 475 sign in center field, sometimes 483 (as was the case in 1954). The ballpark was demolished in 1964, and it is unclear what was being measured when. One theory is that 475 was the distance to the front of the clubhouse overhang, and 483 was the distance to the rear wall under the overhang.

Aftermath and response

The play prevented the Indians from taking the lead and, in the bottom of the 10th, the Giants won the game on their way to sweeping the Series. The Catch is often considered to be one of the best and most memorable plays in the history of baseball because of the difficulty of the play and the importance of the game itself.

Mays himself did not believe "The Catch" to be the best defensive play he ever made. In the CD collection Ernie Harwell's Audio Scrapbook, issued in 2006, Mays talks about a running bare-handed catch he made at Forbes Field in Pittsburgh in 1951, in which the Giants' players teased the young rookie by treating him with complete indifference when he returned to the bench. Mays also cited a catch he made against the center field wall at Ebbets Field in Brooklyn, New York, in which he had to scurry back so fast he did not have time to turn around.

Notes

References

Further reading

External links
Archived at Ghostarchive and the Wayback Machine: 

New York Giants (NL) postseason
Cleveland Indians postseason
1954 Major League Baseball season
World Series games
September 1954 sports events in the United States
1954 in sports in New York City
Historic baseball plays
Baseball competitions in New York City